Chicago Recording Company, or CRC, is a recording studio in Chicago, Illinois, founded in 1975.  Boasting twelve studios, CRC is the largest recording company in the Midwest, and the largest independent studio in the country.

History

Early history
Originally called Sound House Studios, CRC was founded by Alan Kubicka in Medinah, Illinois.  In 1975 the studio moved to Michigan Ave in Chicago, IL and became Chicago Recording Company.  Early records made there include Lovin' Feeling by Phil Upchurch and Don't Fight The Feeling by Jim Peterik.

Music
CRC has been host to dozens of notable artists that have recorded at the company's music studios.  Notably, The Smashing Pumpkins have used the studio numerous times since the mid-1990s.  The video for their single "Untitled" features the band recording in Chicago Recording Company.  Others to record at CRC include Michael Jackson, Carole King, Coldplay, Sting, Timbaland, Rihanna, Styx, Justin Timberlake, Queen Latifah, Death Cab for Cutie, Mavis Staples, Jeremih, Smokey Robinson, Celine Dion, The Cure, Jennifer Hudson, Lady Gaga, Changing Faces, Justin Bieber, Kanye West, Stone Temple Pilots, Resurrection Band, Liz Phair, Duran Duran, Ohio Players, Nine Inch Nails, Red Hot Chili Peppers, R. Kelly, Linkin Park, Alicia Keys, Garbage, Britney Spears, Aaliyah, Pharrell Williams, Snoop Dogg, Ice Cube and Wilco.  The Chicago Cubs' anthem, "Go, Cubs, Go" was recorded at CRC in 1984.

Post
In post audio and sound design, advertising agencies such as FCB, Leo Burnett, Young & Rubicam, and DDB Worldwide frequently produce award-winning advertising in the company's nine post-production studios.  Equally notable are the numerous film, television and gaming productions that the studio's engineers have contributed to, including Watchmen, Toy Story, The Dark Knight, Boardwalk Empire, CSI: NY, Black Swan and NHL 15.

Selected recordings

References

External links
Official Website of Chicago Recording Company

Recording studios in the United States
Companies based in Chicago